Carl Wilhelm Kolbe (20 November 1757/59, Berlin - 13 January 1835, Dessau) was a German etcher, graphic artist and author. He was generally referred to as The Elder to distinguish him from his nephew; a painter who was also named Carl Wilhelm Kolbe.

Biography 
His father, Christian Wilhelm Kolbe, made wallpaper and did goldwork. He attended a French grammar school. After graduating, and a brief time in the employ of Count , he went to Dessau in 1780 to teach French at the Philanthropinum. It was there that he began to write. He returned to Berlin in 1782 and, under the influence of a distant relative, Daniel Chodowiecki, became interested in painting and drawing. After a failed attempt at studying law in Halle, he reassumed his teaching position in Dessau. 

In 1795, he was named a full member of the Prussian Academy of Arts. That same year, he was called by Leopold III, Duke of Anhalt-Dessau, to establish a new art academy in Dessau, but eh project never materialized. Instead, he once again taught French there. During this time, his first etching portfolios appeared; mostly comprising landscapes. In 1798, he was appointed the court copper engraver and was engaged as a drawing teacher for Prince Leopold. From 1805 to 1808, with the Prince's permission, he was a guest of the artist Salomon Gessner, in Zürich, where he produced etchings based on Gessner's paintings.

In addition to his etchings, he produced several books on the subject of "" (linguistic purity); notably Über den Wortreichthum der deutschen und französischen Sprache und beider Anlage zur Poesie ("About the richness of words of the German and French languages and both of their disposition to poetry", in two volumes, 1809 and 1820). In appreciation of his work, he was awarded an honorary Doctorate of Philosophy by the University of Halle in 1810.

He was unable to follow up on the success of his first landscape portfolios and had difficulty finding publishers for his newer works. He published his autobiography in 1825, retired from teaching in 1829 and died six years later, at the age of seventy-seven. .

References

Further reading 
 
 
 Ulf Martens: Der Zeichner und Radierer Carl Wilhelm Kolbe d. Ä. (1759–1835). Dissertation. Universität Hamburg 1976. Mann, Berlin 1976, .
 Norbert Michels (Ed.): Carl Wilhelm Kolbe d. Ä. Imhof, Petersberg 2009, .

External links 

 More works by Kolbe @ ArtNet
 

1750s births
1835 deaths
Year of birth uncertain
German etchers
German male writers
Linguistic purism
Academic staff of the Prussian Academy of Arts
Artists from Berlin